A list of films produced in Pakistan in 1994 (see 1994 in film) and in the Urdu language:

1994

See also
1994 in Pakistan

External links
 Search Pakistani film - IMDB.com

1994
Pakistani
Films